Johannes ("Hans") Wilhelmus Antonius Daams (born 19 January 1962) is a retired road bicycle racer from the Netherlands, who was a professional rider from 1985 to 1989. He represented his native country at the 1984 Summer Olympics in Los Angeles, California, in the individual road race where he didn't finish the race.

His daughter Jessie Daams is also a professional road bicycle racer.

Teams
1985: Kwantum Hallen-Yoko (Netherlands)
1986: Kwantum Hallen-Yoko (Netherlands)
1987: PDM-Concorde (Netherlands)
1988: PDM-Concorde (Netherlands)
1989: PDM-Concorde (Netherlands)

See also
 List of Dutch Olympic cyclists

References

External links
 

1962 births
Living people
Dutch male cyclists
Cyclists at the 1984 Summer Olympics
Olympic cyclists of the Netherlands
People from Valkenswaard
Cyclists from North Brabant